Thomas Carl Richards (February 13, 1930 – August 9, 2020) was a general in the United States Air Force and the former chief of staff of the Supreme Headquarters Allied Powers Europe.

Biography

Early life
Richards was born on February 13, 1930, in San Diego, California. He graduated from Hampton High School, Virginia in 1948.

His military career began with the United States Army infantry in 1948. He served as a platoon sergeant during the Korean War and was wounded twice. He received a commission as a distinguished graduate of the Air Force Reserve Officer Training Corps program at Virginia Polytechnic Institute in 1956, where he earned a bachelor of science degree in business administration. Richards entered pilot training and earned his wings at Goodfellow Air Force Base, Texas, in 1957. After combat crew training, he was assigned as a B-47 Stratojet co-pilot with the Strategic Air Command's 19th Bombardment Wing, Homestead Air Force Base, Florida, from December 1958 to February 1961.

He was upgraded to B-47E Stratojet commander at Little Rock Air Force Base, Arkansas, before being transferred, in July 1961, to the 301st Bombardment Wing at Lockbourne Air Force Base, Ohio. He completed Squadron Officer School in 1963 and received B-52 Stratofortress combat crew training at Castle Air Force Base, California, from May to August 1964. His next assignments were to the 20th Bombardment Squadron at Barksdale Air Force Base, Louisiana, and later to Carswell Air Force Base, Texas. During this period, he was an aircraft commander on the first B-52 combat missions over Vietnam.

Later career
After completing tactical combat crew training and airborne training in October 1966, Richards was assigned to the 19th Tactical Air Support Squadron at Bien Hoa Air Base, Republic of Vietnam, as a forward air controller with the 101st Airborne Division. He served a consecutive tour of duty with the 56th Air Commando Wing at Udorn Royal Thai Air Force Base, Thailand, with detached service at the U.S. Embassy, Vientiane Laos. In addition, he commanded the Raven Forward Air Controllers and flew 624 combat missions in O-1 Bird Dogs, T-28 Trojans, U-10D Super Couriers and U-17 Skywagons.

In January 1969, he returned to the United States and was assigned to the United States Air Force Academy, Colorado, where he served as an executive officer, squadron air officer commanding and group air officer commanding until May 1972. He then attended the Army War College, graduating in 1973.

He transferred to Lackland Air Force Base, Texas, in June 1973 as wing deputy commander, and then served as commander of the Basic Military Training School. That same year, he received a master's degree in communication from Shippensburg State College. In July 1975, he was assigned to the Directorate of Personnel Plans, Office of the Deputy Chief of Staff for Personnel, Headquarters United States Air Force, Washington D.C., as chief of the Motivation and Communications Branch and, later, became chief of the Leadership and Motivation Division.

From November 1976 to December 1977, Richards served as commander of the Air Reserve Personnel Center at Denver. He then returned to the academy as vice commandant of cadets and became commandant of cadets in March 1978. General Richards assumed command of the Air Force Recruiting Service at Randolph Air Force Base, Texas, in February 1981. In March 1982, Richards transferred to Keesler Air Force Base, Mississippi, as commander of the Keesler Technical Training Center. From September 1983 to July 1984, he was assigned as Commander, 8th Air Force, Barksdale Air Force Base, Louisiana. He then became commander of the Air University, Maxwell Air Force Base, Alabama. He assumed that position in November 1986.

He was promoted to general on December 1, 1986, with same date of rank. He retired on September 30, 1989. After his retirement, he was appointed as the administrator of the Federal Aviation Administration. Richards died on August 9, 2020 in San Antonio, Texas.

Awards
Awards earned during his career:

Richards has got more than 4,700 flying hours.

Effective dates of promotions

References

1930 births
2020 deaths
United States Army personnel of the Korean War
United States Air Force personnel of the Vietnam War
American Korean War bomber pilots
American Vietnam War pilots
United States Air Force generals
Air Command and Staff College alumni
United States Army War College alumni
Recipients of the Air Medal
Recipients of the Silver Star
Recipients of the Distinguished Flying Cross (United States)
Recipients of the Order of the Sword (United States)
Recipients of the Legion of Merit
Administrators of the Federal Aviation Administration
People from San Diego
Shippensburg University of Pennsylvania alumni
George H. W. Bush administration personnel